The magnificent tree frog (Ranoidea splendida), also known as the splendid tree frog, is a species of tree frog first described in 1977. It has a limited range, only occurring on the north-western coast of Australia in the Northern Territory and Western Australia. It has a similar appearance to, and can be confused with, the closely related White's tree frog.

Description

The magnificent tree frog is a relatively large tree frog, with the males reaching a length (SVL) of 10.4 cm (4.1 in) and the females 10.6 cm (4.2 in). They have olive to bright green dorsal surfaces with white ventral surfaces. The undersides of the feet and legs are bright yellow. Most specimens have white or sulphur-coloured dots on their backs, of varying densities. The older magnificent tree frogs can be distinguished from White's tree frogs by the presence of very large parotoid glands, which cover the entire top of their heads and droop over their tympana. The tympanum is large, almost the size of the eye, and partially obscured by the parotoid gland.

Ecology and behaviour

Magnificent tree frogs are native to the Kimberley region of Western Australia, and enter caves and rock crevices during the day. Much like the other large tree frogs in Australia, White's tree frog and the giant tree frog, they inhabit areas near humans, and can be found around buildings and in toilets, showers, and water tanks. They are nocturnal, and will hunt and breed at night.

Breeding probably takes place during the wet season. The male's call is very similar to that of White's tree frog, a deep "crawk-crawk-crawk" repeated many times. The breeding habits of the magnificent tree frog have not been extensively studied.

As a pet
It is kept as a pet; in Australia, this animal may be kept in captivity with the appropriate permit.

References

 Database entry includes a range map and justification for why this species is of least concern

Article Road: List of All Frog Breeds: Things You Can Do to Ensure Your Frog Has a Long, Happy and Healthy Life: Magnificent Tree Frog 
Department of Environment, Climate Change and Water, New South Wales: Amphibian Keeper's Licence: Species Lists

External links

Ranoidea (genus)
Amphibians of Western Australia
Amphibians of the Northern Territory
Amphibians described in 1977
Frogs of Australia
Taxobox binomials not recognized by IUCN